The Animals is the American debut album by the British Invasion group, the Animals. Released in late summer 1964, the album introduced the States to the "drawling, dirty R&B sound (with the emphasis on the B)" that typified the group.

The album includes several R&B standards, written by the likes of Chuck Berry, Fats Domino and John Lee Hooker, as well as the number one single "House of the Rising Sun", here presented in its truncated-for-radio form (it would be restored to full length on the February 1966 compilation The Best of the Animals, and later CD and digital reissues of The Animals would feature the full-length recording).

The British album The Animals was released a month later, the group's debut album there albeit with substantially differing contents.

Track listing

Personnel
The Animals
 Eric Burdon – vocals
 Alan Price – organ, vibraphone, guitar, bass guitar, backing vocals
 Hilton Valentine – guitar, backing vocals
 Chas Chandler – bass guitar, backing vocals
 John Steel – drums
Technical
Val Valentin – engineer

References

1964 debut albums
The Animals albums
Albums produced by Mickie Most
MGM Records albums